The 1963 Lady Wigram Trophy was a motor race held at the Wigram Airfield Circuit on 19 January 1963. It was the twelfth Lady Wigram Trophy to be held and was won by Bruce McLaren in the Cooper T62. McLaren became the first New Zealander since Ron Roycroft to win the Lady Wigram Trophy.

Classification

References

Lady Wigram Trophy
Lady
January 1963 sports events in New Zealand